Vezirli is a village in the Yüksekova District of Hakkâri Province in Turkey. The village had a population of 1,378 in 2021.

History 
The village was populated by 19 Assyrian families in 1850 and 35 families in 1877.

References 

Villages in Yüksekova District
Kurdish settlements in Hakkâri Province
Historic Assyrian communities in Turkey